Hollywood Boulevard is a boulevard in Hollywood, Los Angeles, California, United States.

Hollywood Boulevard may also refer to:

 Florida State Road 820 in Hollywood, Florida, also known as Hollywood Boulevard
 The Hollywood Boulevard Historic Business District in Hollywood, Florida, United States
 Hollywood Boulevard (1936 film), directed by Robert Florey
 Hollywood Boulevard (1976 film), directed by Joe Dante and Allan Arkush
 Hollywood Boulevard (1996 film), directed by Stephen Vittoria
 Hollywood Blvd., USA, a 2013 animated short film by Stephen Hillenburg
 Hollywood Boulevard (Walt Disney Studios Park), a studio lot at Walt Disney Studios Park in Disneyland Resort Paris
 "Hollywood Boulevard", a song by the band Big Audio Dynamite